BluePrintReview is an online magazine that publishes short stories, poetry, creative non-fiction and visual art.

History and profile

The magazine was founded in May 2005 by the German author and web freelancer Dorothee Lang, who still edits it. Initially focused on experimental poetry and Flash fiction, it developed a broader spectrum over time. In June 2006, a first print issue was published: the mo(nu)ment issue. At the same time, the Collaborative blog Just a moment became part of the magazine. 

Since the beginning, the concept of BluePrintReview is to explore unexpected connections between texts and images from unrelated places. 

In June 2008, BluePrintReview was reviewed by NewPages.com, and characterized as "an online journal constructed to ease the complex and beautiful convergence of language and art and all the possibilities this entails".

Stories first published in BluePrintReview have been included in the best of the net online anthology by Sundress Publications, and in the Best of the Web anthology from Dzanc Books.

Focus Issue 22: Reprints and Retrieved Magazines
Like most literary journals, BluePrintReview focuses on previously unpublished texts and images, yet includes the guideline note "reprints are fine, but please make sure to indicate this in the submission".

In 2009, a pre-published text in issue 20 induced a mail discussion about the impact of magazine layouts on its content. The key line of this discussion: "It's fascinating how taking the same words, and framing them differently can lead to a very different emotional response—a different experience entirely."

From that discussion, the idea emerged to dedicate a whole blueprintreview issue to reprints, to explore the layout effect further. The issue itself has the theme "re /visit /cycle /turn", it went live in October 2009.

The reprint issue also addresses the in-limbo-situation of orphaned texts: texts that get published in an online publication that later goes offline, leaving the texts as pre-published (and thus difficult to place again), but at the same time as not present any more. (A file with detailed process notes of the reprint issue and copies of the mail conversations is online.)

Following the conversations, it seemed fitting to include some of those "orphaned texts" in the reprint issue – which led to a surprise finding:

To be able to provide an original layout for orphaned magazines, too, and with it, a means to compare the texts in two different frames, the blueprintreview editor tried to trace the original layouts of the previously-online-magazines that first published those orphaned works. And, with the help of Internet [Archive]]s like the 'Waybackmachine', managed to dig up some of the original pages – and then ran into whole issues of magazines thought lost. 

This led to the idea to gather those "lost" links, first as literary blog notes, and later, with further input from blueprintreview contributors as well as from editors of other literary magazine, as "list of retrieved magazines",.

Issues
One key element to BluePrintReview is that there are no given themes. Instead, each issue develops its own theme through submissions. 

Recent issues and their themes:

issue 23, January 2010: (dis)comfort zones
issue 22, October 2009: re /visit /cycle /turn
issue 21, July 2009: Shortcuts/Detours
issue 20, April 2009: The Missing Part
issue 19, January 2009: Beyond the Silence
issue 18, October 2008: Origin and End
issue 17, July 2008: Bodyscapes
issue 16, May 2008: Lost, Found & Stolen
issue 15, February 2008: Shapes
issue 14, November 2007: Night Write

Contributors
 Kari Edwards
 Tao Lin

See also
List of literary magazines

References

 NewPages review
Dzanc Best of the Web
Some Aspects of Reprints

2005 establishments in Germany
German-language magazines
German-language websites
Literary magazines published in Germany
Magazines established in 2005
Online literary magazines
Quarterly magazines published in Germany